Tête-à-tête is a 2006 non-fiction book by Hazel Rowley about the lives of Jean-Paul Sartre and Simone de Beauvoir.

Awards and nominations
In 2006, the editors of Lire magazine included it in a list of the twenty best books written in French of that year.

References

External links
Nehring, Christina (4 December 2005). "TÊTE-À-TÊTE". "Sunday Book Review", The New York Times.

Biographies about writers
2006 non-fiction books
Chatto & Windus books
HarperCollins books
Works about Jean-Paul Sartre
Simone de Beauvoir
French books
French women novelists